The status of religious freedom around the world varies from country to country. States can differ based on whether or not they guarantee equal treatment under law for followers of different religions, whether they establish a state religion (and the legal implications that this has for both practitioners and non-practitioners), the extent to which religious organizations operating within the country are policed, and the extent to which religious law is used as a basis for the country's legal code.

There are further discrepancies between some countries' self-proclaimed stances of religious freedom in law and the actual practice of authority bodies within those countries: a country's establishment of religious equality in their constitution or laws does not necessarily translate into freedom of practice for residents of the country. Additionally, similar practices (such as having citizens identify their religious preference to the government or on identification cards) can have different consequences depending on other sociopolitical circumstances specific to the countries in question.

Over 120 national constitutions mention equality regardless of religion.

Africa

Asia

Europe

North America

Oceania

South America

See also

 Apostasy in Islam by country
 Freedom of religion
 Separation of church and state
 Toleration
 State religion
 :Category:Freedom of religion by country

References

External links